Coiled-coil domain containing 166 is a protein that in humans is encoded by the CCDC166 gene. Its function is currently unknown. It contains a  coiled-coil domain, hence the current origin of its name. It is primarily expressed in the testes.

Gene 

The gene currently is known to contain only two exons, and one isoform. This primary transcript consists of 1320 DNA base pairs. Its location is on chromosome 8q24.3, between positions 143706694-143708109, on the + strand. The gene is located near BREA2 and MAPK15.

Transcripts 

The gene has only a single transcript, due to only have two exons, both which are always transcribed. The coding portion of the mRNA is 1320 nucleotides. In tissues found to express the transcript for this gene it is typically found in low levels.

Protein 

CCDC166 has only one isoform in humans, which has a molecular weight of 48.7 kDa and is composed of 439 amino acids. The pI of the protein is 10.537. The protein has several amino acid repeat structures including; EREA, VQSL and (T)QLLH, all of which are conserved in mammals. The composition of the protein reveals that it is high in serine, lysine, and arginine. The protein contains three conserved domains including a coiled-coil domain between amino acids 27-74, a domain of unknown function between amino acids 72-260, and a serine-rich domain between amino acids 288-410. It is believed that the 26-115 AA region is a SH3 domain. The structure is mainly composed of alpha-helices that form a larger coiled-coil. It also contains several coiled-coils.

Gene level regulation 

The gene seems to be expressed heavily in the testes, and this may be conserved in evolution. The promoter region contains several conserved transcription factor binding sites. Notably among them are the CREB family, KLFs, and perhaps the most telling of which is the presence of Testis-determining factor. These transcription factors are all important during the process of development.

Transcript level regulation 

In situ hybridization (ISH) data has found the gene's mRNAs are mostly found in the nucleus of Sertoli cells, with low expression in Leydig cells. The gene has also been found in other germ cell tumors. In addition the gene's primary transcript contains several miRNA binding sites, including: hsa-miR-2278, hsa-miR-3178, and hsa-miR-4516.

Protein level regulation 

CCDC166 is predicted to be regulated by SUMO protein. It has a conserved IKAD sequence at amino acid 220-223. This combined with a conserved nuclear localization signal of PKKKR starting at amino acid 3, supports that this protein is imported into the nucleus. The gene also contains several predicted phosphorylation sites, most of which are predicted to be clustered into the serine-rich domain. The occurrences of highest probability occur at serine 10, serine 308, and serine 391.

Homology / evolution 

While the current function of the gene is unknown, many mammals possess on ortholog of the gene. In various primate species studies, several species have been found to possess on orthologous gene that shares 90% sequence identity. While the gene does not seem to have paralogs, it has homologs that have been conserved throughout its evolutionary history. Evidence that its function has been conserved comes from the promoter region, which has predicted SRY-transcription factors binding sites conserved from zebrafish all the way to humans.

Function / biochemistry 

The function of the protein is currently unknown.

Interactions 

The gene has been found to interact with FAT3, a tumor suppressor gene, as well as INTS2 a gene that is involved in snRNA processing and transcription. Expression of CCDC166 has shown to be affected by methylphenidate, but the mechanism of this interaction is not known.

Clinical significance 

CCDC166 has some single nucleotide variants that are associated with lung, liver colon, thyroid pancreatic and testicular cancers. The clinical significance of the protein has not been fully characterized as of yet, however.

References

External links